Clover Park Technical College (CPTC) is a community college in Lakewood, Washington. There is also a smaller campus located at Thun Field in Puyallup, Washington (South Hill), for Aviation Training.

Academics
The main CPTC campus has an enrollment of 3,500 full-time and 18,000 part-time students. The areas of study offered are:

 Aerospace & Advanced Manufacturing (South Hill campus only)
 Health Sciences & Human Services
 Business & Hospitality
 Science, Technology & Engineering
 Transportation & Trades

Depending on the program, CPTC offers Bachelor of Applied Science, Associate of Applied Technology (AAT) degrees and certificates. In fall 2014, the college launched its first applied baccalaureate program with its Bachelor of Applied Science in Manufacturing Operations.

Since 2002 the college has undergone an extensive construction program to convert what was once a World War II navy supply base into a modern, pedestrian-oriented campus. The college employs 431 full- and part-time faculty, exempt and classified salaried employees.

CPTC also manages the Northwest Career & Technical High School. NWC&THS allows high school students to complete their diploma while simultaneously taking classes in their career program. In Fall of 2003 NWCTHS opened with 21 students. In 2005 it had 16 graduates. The NWC&THS currently has around 200 students.

History
The college was created by the Clover Park School District in 1942 as a vocational school to train 3,500 civilians as auto mechanics for the nearby McChord Field and Fort Lewis Army Post, and shipfitters, welders and blueprint readers for Tacoma shipyards.

After the war training was expanded to include aircraft mechanics, and Civil Aeronautics Administration certification. In 1954 the vocational school moved to its current location, and since has added over 50 training programs in a wide range of specialties.

Originally named "Clover Park Vocational Technical Institute," in 1991 the school became Clover Park Technical College when the Washington state legislature passed the workforce training bill, converting the state's five two-year vocational schools into technical colleges, and joining them with the state's 29 community colleges.

The school is the home of I-91 FM-KVTI, a 50,000 watt, student operated radio station and "CollegeVision" (Comcast ch28 and Click! ch89) which is an educational cable channel available in Pierce County.

The CPTC campus was the site of Tacoma Speedway prior to World War II.

See also
 Clover Park High School
 Clover Park School District
 Tacoma Speedway

References
https://www.airfieldsfreeman.com/WA/Airfields_WA_Tacoma.htm#cloverpark

https://www.cptc.edu/history

https://www.cptc.edu/schools

External links
 Official website

Universities and colleges in Tacoma, Washington
Community colleges in Washington (state)
Lakewood, Washington
Universities and colleges accredited by the Northwest Commission on Colleges and Universities
Technological universities in the United States